The SS Adviser was a steamship in the service of the Harrison Line from 1939.  On 15 Nov 1942, she was cruising about 200 miles southeast of Durban.  At 01.45 hours she was attacked by U-178 and struck by two torpedoes. The crew abandoned the ship, concerned that it was sinking. But when they heard depth charges being dropped at some distance they reboarded the ship the following morning. Two tugs took the ship into tow and brought it safely to Durban arriving on 19 November. She was repaired and returned to service in August 1943.

On 7 November 1949 Richard Acland, MP for Gravesend asked Jim Callaghan, the Minister of Transport as regards the standards of the crews quarters. He was informed that whilst they were not up to the standards of modern ships, they were considered adequate, although the owners were asked to deal with some minor issues.

References

Ships of the Harrison Line
1939 ships